Judge Not is a 1920 British silent drama film directed by Einar Bruun and starring Fay Compton, Fred Groves and Eric Barclay.

Cast
 Fay Compton as Nelly  
 Fred Groves as Burke  
 Chappell Dossett as Frank Raymond  
 Eric Barclay as Billy  
 Frank Stanmore 
 Mary Brough 
 Henry Vibart 
 George Bellamy 
 Wallace Bosco 
 Christine Silver

References

Bibliography
 Palmer Scott. British Film Actors' Credits, 1895-1987. McFarland, 1988.

External links

1920 films
1920 drama films
British silent feature films
British drama films
British black-and-white films
1920s English-language films
1920s British films
Silent drama films